Active Gross Rating Point (Active GRP, also iGRP) is the industry standard for measurement and weighting of online advertising effectiveness for cross-media campaigns with shared audiences. Active GRP acknowledges the online factor and adjusts reach through Active Opportunity to See (Active OTS). Active GRP is interchangeable with, and can be used in addition to, standard GRP.

Active GRP is calculated using the frequency for online users, or Active OTS, based on the reach in the online demographic expressed as a percentage of the total population target demographic. Specifically Active GRPs quantify the impressions generated as a percentage of reach weighted for online audiences.

Purpose

Active GRP is used to create transparency and comparability of online and traditional media campaigns. The purpose of the metric is to measure impressions in relation to the number of people in the target audience for an advertising campaign. Active GRP is commonly used by media buyers to evaluate the comparative strength and or success of a marketing vehicle.

Construction

Active GRP is the product of the online audience reached, times the number of times they saw an advertisement expressed as a percentage of the target demographic.

Active GRP (%) = 100 x Active OTS (#) ÷ Target Demographic (#)

Active OTS is a metric used in place of ratings and poll data. The online target audience is defined by first distinguishing between ‘online active’ and ‘online inactive’ segments of the population and second by segmenting ‘verified’ and ‘non-verified’ audience segments determined through demographic targeting technology.

Active OTS = Impressions in target demographic (#) + ( Remaining impressions (#) x Active Audience Ratio (%) )

Active Audience Ratio = Target demographic online ÷ Population online

Use

Active GRP is most often used to measure additional reach of cross media print and television advertising online. It is used by most major online publishers and advertiser and is accredited by the Media Rating Council.

See also

 Gross rating point
 Reach (advertising)
 Effective frequency

References

Online advertising services and affiliate networks